The Golden Bough Playhouse is a historic two-story theatre in Carmel-by-the-Sea, California on Monte Verde St., between 8th and 9th Avenues. The playhouse occupies the site of the former Carmel Arts and Crafts Club, Carmel's first cultural center and theatre, built in 1906–1907 on Casanova Street, and the Arts and Crafts Hall, built in 1923–1924 on an adjacent lot on Monte Verde Street. The theatre was recorded with the National Register of Historic Places on July 3, 2002. It is significant as a California historic building because it is located on the original site of the Carmel Arts and Crafts Club and theatre, the oldest performing arts venues in Carmel.

The early Carmel bohemians participated in events held at these facilities, including writers Mary Austin and George Sterling. The dramatic presentations there achieved national attention as early as 1914, and an article in The Mercury Herald commented "...a fever of activity seems to have seized the community and each newcomer is immediately inoculated and begins with great enthusiasm to do something... with plays, studios and studies...".

Both the clubhouse and the Arts & Crafts Hall were destroyed by fire in 1949. The current building, which now houses 2 theatres, was built in 1952 by Edward G. Kuster, owner and operator of both the Golden Bough Playhouse, as well as its predecessor, the Theatre of the Golden Bough, which was located on Ocean Ave.

Since 1994, the facility has been owned and operated by Pacific Repertory Theatre, Monterey County's only year-round professional theatre company. A two-phase renovation of the aging facility began with an interior building project in 2011. A second phase project, including both interior and exterior renovations, is scheduled for 2021.

History

Carmel Arts and Crafts Club theatre 
In 1905, to foster the arts in the village of Carmel-by-the-Sea, California, the Carmel Arts and Crafts Club was formed.  After the 1906 San Francisco earthquake, the village received an influx of artists and other creative people escaping the disaster area. Jack London describes the artists' colony in a portion of his novel, The Valley of the Moon.  Among the noted writers and poets who thrived in Carmel and were associated with the club were Mary Austin, George Sterling, Robinson Jeffers and Sinclair Lewis.

In 1906–07, the club built the town's first cultural center and theatre, The Carmel Arts and Crafts Clubhouse.  

Poets Jane Austin and George Sterling performed their "private theatricals" there. By 1913, The Arts and Crafts Club had begun organizing lessons for aspiring painters, actors & craftsmen. 

Some of the most prominent painters in the United States, such as William Merritt Chase, Xavier Martinez, Mary DeNeale Morgan and C. Chapel Judson offered six weeks of instruction for $15. The dramas enacted by the Arts and Crafts Club attracted considerable attention, with an article in The Clubwoman noting, "Probably no other women's club in the country has achieved a more remarkable success in the way of dramatic ventures than has The Carmel Club of Arts and Crafts".

Golden Bough Theatre 
Theatrical activities in the town grew to such a proportion that between 1922 and 1924, two competing indoor theatres were built - the Carmel Arts and Crafts Hall on Monte Verde Street (which was renamed numerous times including the Abalone Theatre, the Filmarte, and the Carmel Playhouse) and the first Theatre of the Golden Bough, located on Ocean Ave near the SE corner of Monte Verde Street. This "Golden Bough" (one of two) was designed and built by Edward G. "Ted" Kuster. Kuster was a musician and lawyer from Los Angeles who relocated to Carmel to establish his own theatre and school.

Abalone Theatre and Manzanita Theatre 
In 1928, the Abalone League, a local amateur baseball club and active thespian group, bought the Arts and Crafts Hall from the Carmel Arts and Crafts Club and renamed it the Abalone Theatre, and later that year Kuster leased the Theatre of the Golden Bough (on Ocean Ave) to a local movie exhibitor, the Manzanita Theatre. Kuster then traveled to Europe for one year to study production techniques in Berlin and to negotiate for rights to produce English and European plays in the United States.

In 1929, after returning from is European trip, Kuster was approached by the Abalone League who, beset by financial trouble, offered to sell Kuster its entire theatre operation, including both Monte Verde and Casanova Street buildings - an offer that Kuster readily accepted. Kuster remodeled the facility and renamed it the Studio Theatre of the Golden Bough. He moved all of his activities - plays concerts, traveling theatre groups, lectures - to the theatre on Monte Verde Street. He then leased the theatre of the Golden Bough on Ocean Avenue to a movie theater chain for a period of five years. Kuster stipulated that the name "Golden Bough" could not be used for a movie house so it was renamed the Carmel Theatre.

Carmel Theatre and Fires 
From 1932 until 1934, Kuster produced plays in San Francisco and directed a season for the Fresno Players where his translation of By Candlelight is first presented. In 1935, Kuster renegotiated his lease with the movie tenants of the Theatre of the Golden Bough (on Ocean Ave.), to perform a stage play one weekend each month. On May 17, 1935, he opened his production of By Candlelight, but two nights later, on May 19, the original Theatre of the Golden Bough was destroyed by fire. Arson was the suspected cause of the blaze. Kuster, who had previously bought out the Arts and Crafts Theatre, moved his film operation to the older facility on Monte Verde Street, renamed it the Filmarte and it became the first "art house" between Los Angeles and San Francisco.

In 1936, Kuster returned to San Francisco to a Sutter and Van Ness 200-seat theater, naming it the Golden Bough Playhouse.  In 1938, Theatre labor union problems forced him to give up the project. Later that year he was invited to Hollywood for two years as the personal assistant to Max Reinhardt. While there, he taught classes and directed English and American plays in Reinhardt's Theatre Workshop. In 1940, Kuster returned to Carmel and the Filmarte, whose lease had expired, renamed it the Golden Bough Playhouse and again presented plays, foreign films and quality American films year-round. For two summers, 1940 and 1941, he directed the Golden Bough School of Theatre.

In 1949, after remounting By Candlelight, this second "Golden Bough" also burned to the ground. Once again, arson was suspected. Kuster considered rebuilding two theatres, a playhouse at the Monte Verde location, and a movie theatre at the site of the original Golden Bough on Ocean Avenue. Ultimately, he built a two-theater facility on the Monte Verde site. The main auditorium, called the Golden Bough, faced Monte Verde Street. With 330 seats and an ample stage it was designed to present both movies and live performances. Beneath the main stage, an intimate 150-seat theater in the round, called the "Circle Theatre," faced Casanova Street. The new Golden Bough opened its doors on October 2, 1952, with a Monterey Symphony Orchestra concert.

United Artists Theaters 
Kuster died in September 1961. In 1965 the Golden Bough was sold to United California Theatres—a movie chain that was later absorbed by United Artists Theaters. For the next 29 years it was a first-run movie house known as the Golden Bough Cinema. The Circle Players continued to rent the Circle Theater for two more years until a city building inspector noted several deficiencies in the electrical system. Lacking funds for repair, the Circle Theatre closed in 1967.

Pacific Repertory Theatre 

In 1994, United Artists put the theatre up for sale. The building was purchased by Pacific Repertory Theatre (PacRep), Monterey County's only year-round professional theatre company.  The facility includes the 330-seat Golden Bough Theatre and a revitalized 120-seat Circle Theatre, presenting over 175 performances in Carmel every year.  In 2006, the Carmel Historic Resources Board gave approval for PacRep to make modifications to the building, including remodeling or demolition.

In 2008, PacRep presented the Carmel Planning Commission with concept plans for a renovated facility. The first phase of remodeling was completed 2011, and included safety updates, a digital projection system, and a double-revolving stage. Fundraising for the second phase, to include a reconfiguration of the audience seating and the lobby, began in 2017. The phase 2 remodel is projected to take place in 2021.

References

 

  

Regional theatre in the United States
Performing arts centers in California
Theatres in California
Tourist attractions in Monterey County, California
Buildings and structures in Monterey County, California
California Historical Landmarks
Theatres completed in 1952
Carmel-by-the-Sea, California